Big Hatchet Peak is the high point of the Big Hatchet Mountains, a small but rugged range in the southwest corner (the "Bootheel") of New Mexico, in the United States. They lie primarily on BLM land.

The peak rises steeply out of the Playas Valley, to the west, and the Hachita Valley, to the east of the range. The summit stands about 4,000 feet above the valley floors. Also, the north and west faces of the peak are particularly steep, making for an impressive mountain.

Geologically this range is part of the Basin and Range Province which spans much of the southwestern U.S. and parts of northern Mexico. It is a fault-block range made up of Paleozoic limestone and Cretaceous shale and sandstones.

Ecologically, the Big Hatchet Mountains lie near the Chihuahuan Desert and the Sonoran Desert, but their large relief provides many ecological niches more in keeping with the mountains to the north. Notable inhabitants include bats, raptors, bighorn sheep, and javelina.

The Big Hatchet Mountains are far from population centers, and have no paved road access or developed recreation sites; they therefore see little recreational activity. However the standard route on the peak, along the South Ridge from Thompson Canyon, is straightforward.

Gallery

References

External links
 

New Mexico Bootheel
Landforms of Hidalgo County, New Mexico
Mountains of New Mexico
Mountains of Hidalgo County, New Mexico